Ittihad ash-Sha'ab ('Unity of the People') was a daily newspaper published from Baghdad, Iraq. It was the main organ of the Iraqi Communist Party. Abd al-Qadir Isma'il al-Bustani was the editor-in-chief of the paper which had a circulation of 15,000 copies.

After the minor splinter group of Daud as-Sayegh had been accorded the legal recognition of the name 'Iraqi Communist Party' in early 1960, the mainstream (and un-recognized) Iraqi Communist Party became informally known as the 'Ittihad ash-Sha'ab Party'. On 15 February 1960, the party sought legal recognition under the Associations Law under the name 'People's Unity Party' (i.e. Ittihad ash-Sha'ab Party), but this application was rejected by the Ministry of Interior.

During 1960, Ittihad ash-Sha'ab and other publications of the mainstream Communist Party were targeted by the Abd al-Karim Qasim government. In March 1960 Brigadier Sayyid Hamid Sayyid Hussein issued an order prohibiting the circulation of Ittihad ash-Sha'ab in seven districts of southern Iraq. From June 1960, distribution of Ittihad ash-Sha'ab was restricted in half of Iraq (including major cities) through security restrictions and harassment by police forces. On 30 September 1960 the newspaper was closed down for a period of ten months. Next month it was banned by the government. Abd al-Qadir Isma'il al-Bustani was sentenced to three months imprisonment (Qasim did, however, order his release the day after the sentence had been issued). Abd al-Jabbar Wahbi, another member of the Ittihad ash-Sha'ab editorial board, was placed under house arrest in Ramadi.

References

1960 establishments in Iraq
1960 disestablishments in Iraq
Arabic communist newspapers
Communist newspapers published in Iraq
Defunct newspapers published in Iraq
Iraqi Communist Party
Mass media in Baghdad
Newspapers established in 1960
Publications disestablished in 1960
Banned newspapers